Tuscola Township is one of nine townships in Douglas County, Illinois, USA.  As of the 2010 census, its population was 5,259 and it contained 2,459 housing units.

Geography

Cities, towns, villages
 Tuscola

Unincorporated towns
 Hayes at 
 Hillcrest at 
 Meadowview at 
 North Prairie Acres at 
 Northgate at 
 Parkview at 
 Southland Acres at 
 West Ridge at 
 Yoder Addition at

Cemeteries
The township contains these three cemeteries: Mount Zion, Nelson and Tuscola Township.

Major highways
  Interstate 57
  U.S. Route 36
  U.S. Route 45

Airports and landing strips
 Cooper Landing Field (historical)
 Tuscola Airport

Demographics

School districts
 Tuscola Community Unit School District 301
 Villa Grove Community Unit School District 302

Political districts
 State House District 110
 State Senate District 55

References
 
 United States Census Bureau 2009 TIGER/Line Shapefiles
 United States National Atlas

External links
 City-Data.com
 Illinois State Archives
 Township Officials of Illinois

Townships in Douglas County, Illinois
Townships in Illinois